Marc Smet (born 5 February 1951) is a retired Belgian long-distance runner. He competed in the marathon at the 1980 Summer Olympics.

References

1951 births
Living people
Athletes (track and field) at the 1976 Summer Olympics
Athletes (track and field) at the 1980 Summer Olympics
Belgian male long-distance runners
Belgian male marathon runners
Olympic athletes of Belgium
Sportspeople from Antwerp